Washington Public Utilities Commission or Washington Public Service Commission can refer to:

District of Columbia Public Service Commission, in Washington, D.C.
Washington Utilities and Transportation Commission, in Washington State